The Ladies of the House, also known under the working title of Stripped, is a 2014 grindhouse film and the directorial debut of actor John Stuart Wildman. The film had its world premiere on April 4, 2014 at the Dallas International Film Festival, and marks the first non-pornographic film by the former adult actress Belladonna.

Funding for The Ladies of the House was partially raised through a successful Kickstarter campaign.

Synopsis
Jacob (Gabriel Horn), his brother Kai (RJ Hanson), and their friend Derrick (Samrat Chakrabarti) have decided that the best way to celebrate Kai's birthday is to go to a strip club. Kai ends up taking a liking to one of the strippers, Ginger (Belladonna), and they decide to follow her home. Upon discovering them, Ginger decides to invite them inside for some drinks. Kai and Ginger are sent into a closet to play seven minutes in heaven, which ends with Derrick accidentally killing her after she shoots Kai in the shoulder to prevent him from raping her. Before the boys can leave, Ginger's roommates return home, and after seeing Ginger, they decide that they will hunt and kill the three men. They soon find that Ginger's roommates are cannibals that are intent on turning the three of them into several meals.

Cast
Farah White as Lin
Melodie Sisk as Getty
Brina Palencia as Crystal
Michelle Sinclair as Ginger
Gabriel Horn as Jacob
Samrat Chakrabarti as Derek
Rj Hanson as Kai
Frank Mosley as Piglet

Reception
The Ladies of the House received a positive reception from the horror review websites Dread Central and Bloody Disgusting. Bloody Disgusting wrote that while the film was not perfect, that "Wildman and Walford have their heads and hearts in the right place and can only get better from here. A solid first effort even if it wasn’t my cup of tea to start with." Twitch Film wrote a positive review for the movie, which they felt "succeeds in making grindhouse both intelligent and sexy".

References

External links
 

2014 films
2014 horror films
Kickstarter-funded films
2014 directorial debut films
Films about striptease
2010s English-language films